Opátka is a village and municipality in Košice-okolie District in the Kosice Region of eastern Slovakia.

History
In historical records the village was first mentioned in 1445.

Geography
The village lies at an altitude of 460 metres and covers an area of 13.903 km2.
It has a population of almost 85 people.

Ethnicity
The population is entirely Slovak in ethnicity.

Culture
The village has a small public library and a general store.

External links

Villages and municipalities in Košice-okolie District